"Más más más" is a 2020 song by Dominican-Dutch singer Rolf Sanchez that charted in the Dutch and Belgian singles charts. Rolf Sanchez, a Dominican-Dutch singer was born as Rolf Wienk in Ede, Netherlands on July 3 1991 is a Dominican-Dutch singer and was famous after having taken part in 2011 in the fourth season of the Dutch version of television show X Factor, where he finished third place. "Más más más" was released on 8ball and Top Act label and distributed by Universal Records. Co-written by Rolf "Sanchez" Wienk in collaboration, the track was produced by La$$a. It peaked at number one on both the Dutch Single Top 100 and the Dutch Top 40 charts. 

It follows his 2019 salsa tune "Paso a Paso" on the Billboard Latin charts, and him taking part in the Dutch singing program Beste Zangers in 2019, where he sang the song "Pa Olvidarte" together with Emma Heesters. The song reached number two on both the Dutch Top 40 and the Single Top 100. "Más más más" comes as a follow up to his hit "Como tu" that made it to number 22 on the Dutch Top 40.

Charts

Weekly charts

Year-end charts

Certifications

See also
List of Dutch Top 40 number-one singles of 2020

References

2020 singles
Spanish-language songs
Dutch-language songs